Hercules Wilson was an American politician. He represented McIntosh County, Georgia in the Georgia House of Representatives from 1882 until 1885.

Early life
Hercules Wilson was born in Georgia. He had at least one sibling, Anthony Wilson.

Career
Wilson was a brickmason. 

He ran to represent McIntosh County, Georgia in the Georgia House of Representatives in 1882. He was endorsed by Tunis Campbell. Wilson won the election.
He ran for re-election in 1884. During the election, the Union and Recorder in Milledgeville noted that: "He will feel lonesome having no one of his color to keep him company." He won re-election and served a second term through 1885. His brother Anthony also won election and served during this term. While in the House, Wilson lived with his brother Anthony and other fellow African-American legislator with the last name Frasier from Liberty County, Georgia.

See also

African-American officeholders during and following the Reconstruction era

References

Members of the Georgia House of Representatives
Year of birth missing
Year of death missing
African-American men in politics
Brickmakers
19th-century African-American politicians
19th-century American politicians
People from Darien, Georgia